Pestana or Pestaña may refer to:

Ángel Pestaña (1886–1937), Spanish Anarcho-syndicalist and later Syndicalist leader
Augusto Pestana, Brazilian city in the State of Rio Grande do Sul
Augusto Pestana (politician), Brazilian engineer and politician
Hélio Pestana (born 1985), Portuguese actor and model, booked by Layjan agency
Paulo Dinarte Gouveia Pestana (born 1985), Portuguese footballer
Pestana Group, currently the largest Portuguese tourism and leisure group
Pestana Hotels and Resorts, brand of the Pestana Group